Senji may refer to:

 Senji, South Khorasan, a village in South Khorasan, Iran
 Senji, Salmas, a village in Salmas County, West Azerbaijan, Iran
 Senji, Urmia, a village in Urmia County, West Azerbaijan, Iran
 Senji, Chennai, a village in western outskirts of Chennai, Tamil Nadu, India
 Senji, Villupuram, also known as Gingee, a town in Villupuram district, Tamil Nadu, India

See also
 Sanji (disambiguation)